Naikoon Provincial Park is a provincial park on northeastern Graham Island in the Haida Gwaii archipelago, British Columbia, Canada. It is the ancestral home of the Gwak'rala'chala people, one of the many tribes that form the native group Haida.

See also
Duu Guusd Heritage Site/Conservancy

References

 Ross, Matt. Haida Nation secures park management contract. Raven's Eye; Jun2003, Vol. 7 Issue 2, p12, 1/3p
 Seattle Post-Intelligencer, July 4, 2007. Haida Country: It takes a certain ruggedness to live here

External links

BritishColumbia.com - BC Parks - Naikoon Provincial Park, Queen Charlotte Islands

Provincial parks of British Columbia
Graham Island
1973 establishments in British Columbia
Protected areas established in 1973